Rossia brachyura is a species of bobtail squid native to the tropical western Atlantic Ocean, specifically the Greater and Lesser Antilles.

A. E. Verrill describes a female R. brachyura specimen measuring 18 mm in mantle length (given as "length of body, above").

The type specimen was collected in the Caribbean Sea. It is deposited at the Museum of Comparative Zoology of Harvard University, although the location given for the type specimen has not been recently confirmed.

References

External links

Bobtail squid
Molluscs of the Atlantic Ocean
Fauna of the Caribbean
Fauna of the Dominican Republic
Molluscs of North America
Molluscs described in 1883